Walter Hauser (1 May 1837, in Wädenswil – 22 October 1902) was a Swiss politician and member of the Swiss Federal Council (1888–1902).

He was elected to the Federal Council on 13 December 1888 and died in office on 22 October 1902. He was affiliated to the Free Democratic Party of Switzerland. 

During his office time he held the following departments:
Military Department (1889–1890)
Department of Finance (1891–1899)
Political Department (1900)
Department of Finance (1901–1902)
He was President of the Confederation twice in 1892 and 1900.

Walther-Hauser-Strasse in Wädenswil is named after him.

References

Further reading

External links

1837 births
1902 deaths
People from Wädenswil
Swiss Calvinist and Reformed Christians
Free Democratic Party of Switzerland politicians
Foreign ministers of Switzerland
Finance ministers of Switzerland
Members of the Federal Council (Switzerland)
Members of the National Council (Switzerland)
Members of the Council of States (Switzerland)
Presidents of the Council of States (Switzerland)